The National Unity Association is a Greek political party, founded by retired officers of the Hellenic Armed Forces. The president of the party is Anargyros Saripapas. Its ideology is social and romantic patriotism. It first participated in the May 2012 Greek legislative election.

Electoral results

External links
  

Conservative parties in Greece
Eastern Orthodox political parties